MEMS sensor generations represent the progress made in micro sensor technology and can be categorized as follows:

1st Generation MEMS sensor element mostly based on a silicon structure, sometimes combined with analog amplification on a micro chip.

2nd GenerationMEMS sensor element combined with analog amplification and analog-to-digital converter on one micro chip.

3rd Generation Fusion of the sensor element with analog amplification, analog-to-digital converter and digital intelligence for linearization and temperature compensation on the same micro chip.

4th Generation Memory cells for calibration- and temperature compensation data are added to the elements of the 3rd MEMS sensor generation.

References

Microtechnology